"Peri Bathous, Or the Art of Sinking in Poetry" is a short essay by Alexander Pope published in 1728. The aim of the essay is to ridicule contemporary poets.

Content 
"Peri Bathous" is a blow Pope struck in an ongoing struggle against the "dunces". It is a prose parody of Longinus' Peri Hupsous (On the Sublime), in that he imitates Longinus' system for the purpose of ridiculing contemporary poets.  According to John Upton, the title reflects an actual phrase in Longinus' treatise, εἰ ἔστιν ὕψους τις ἢ βάθους τέχνη, in which "βάθους" is a scribal error for "πάθους".

With the essay, Pope introduced the use of the term "bathos" (Greek βάθος, depth, the antonym to ὕψος (hupsos), height) to mean a failed attempt at sublimity, a ridiculous failure to sustain it, or, more generally, an anticlimax.

Although Pope's manual of bad verse offers numerous methods for writing poorly, of all these ways to "sink", the method that is most remembered now is the act of combining very serious matters with very trivial ones. The radical juxtaposition of the serious with the frivolous does two things.  First, it violates "decorum", or the fittingness of subject, and, second, it creates humor with an unexpected and improper juxtaposition.

Comic use of the figures of speech 
In chapter X, titled Of Tropes and Figures: and first of the variegating, confusing and reversing Figures, Pope explains the comic use of the tropes and figures of speech. This part is continued in chapter XI, titled The Figures continued: Of the Magnifying and Diminishing Figures. Among the figures covered are: Catachresis.

Models of reference 
The nearest model for Pope's essay is the Treatise of the Sublime by Boileau of 1712.  Pope admired Boileau, but one of Pope's (and Swift's) literary adversaries, Leonard Welsted, had issued a "translation" of Longinus in 1726 that was merely a translation of Boileau.  Because Welsted and Pope's other foes were championing this "sublime," Pope commented upon and countered their system with his Peri Bathous in the Swift-Pope-Gay-Arbuthnot Miscellanies.  Whereas Boileau had offered a detailed discussion of all the ways in which poetry could ascend or be "awe-inspiring," Pope offers a lengthy schematic of the ways in which authors might "sink" in poetry, satirizing the very men who were allied with Ambrose Philips.  Pope and Philips had been adversaries since the publication of Pope's Odes, and the rivalry broke down along political lines.

One example of Pope's style and satire shows in his description of sinking in painting.  In the commonplace Academic hierarchic ranking of pictorial genres, still life ranked the lowest.  However, Pope describes how it might fall and, with the single word "stiffen," evokes the unnatural deadness that is a mark of failure even in this "low" genre:

Many Painters who could never hit a Nose or an Eye, have with Felicity copied a Small-Pox, or been admirable at a Toad or a Red-Herring. And seldom are we without Genius's for Still Life, which they can work up and stiffen with incredible Accuracy. ("Peri Bathous" vi).

See also
 1728 in poetry

Notes and references

Bibliography 
 Alexander Pope, The Major Works, Oxford University Press, 2006. Contains Pope's Peri Bathous at pp. 195–238

1728 essays
Essays about poetry
Satirical works
Humour
Works by Alexander Pope